The Hanriot H.41 was a military trainer aircraft produced in France in the 1920s. It was a further development in the family of aircraft that had commenced with the HD.14 in 1920, and incorporated a number of design features that had been developed for other members of that family. Like those other aircraft, however, it was a conventional, two-bay biplane with unstaggered wings of equal span.

The H.41 used the modern engine and mixed construction developed for the HD.40 air ambulance and used them in a new design for a military trainer. The design did not prove a success, however, and only eleven were built, with three different engine types. A floatplane variant based on the HD.17 was slightly more successful, with twelve examples exported to Greece and Portugal.

Variants

H.41Two-seat training aircraft.
H.410version with Lorraine 5Pa engine (5 built)
H.411version with Salmson 7Ac engine (2 built)
LH.412version with Lorraine 5Pb engine (4 built, plus 3 converted from H.410)
HD.41H:(Hydro) - floatplane with Salmson 9Ac engine (12 built)+ (10 built in Yugoslav Aircraft factory "Zmaj" Zemun)

Operators

Portuguese Navy

Yugoslav Royal Navy

Hellenic Navy
Hellenic Air Force

Specifications (variant)

References

Further reading

H.041
1920s French military trainer aircraft
Aircraft first flown in 1925
Single-engined tractor aircraft
Biplanes